The 1959 World Ninepin Bowling Classic Championships was the fourth edition of the championships and was held in Bautzen, East Germany, from 22 to 27 September 1959.

In the men's competition the title was won by Yugoslavia in the team competition and by Eberhard Luther (East Germany) in the individual event. In the women's competition the title was won by East Germany in the team competition and by Hilde Beljan (East Germany) in the individual event.

Participating teams

Men

Women

Results

Men - team 
The competition was played with 200 throws mixed (100 full, 100 clean). Teams were composed of 6 competitors and the scores were added up.

|}

Women - team 
The competition was played with 100 throws mixed (50 full, 50 clean). Teams were composed of 6 competitors and the scores were added up.

|}

Men - individual 

|}

Women - individual 

|}

Medal summary

Medal table

Men

Women

References 
 WC Archive on KZS
 WC History on WNBA NBC

World Ninepin Bowling Classic Championships
1959 in bowling
1959 in German sport
International sports competitions hosted by East Germany
Sport in Saxony